Euborellia annulata is a species of earwig in the family Anisolabididae. It is used for the control of the Asian Corn Borer, a moth of the order Lepidoptera, and a pest of corn in East Asia.

References

Anisolabididae